Neotogaria is a genus of moths belonging to the subfamily Thyatirinae of the Drepanidae.

Species
 Neotogaria anguligera (Hampson, 1893)
 Neotogaria baenzigeri Laszlo, G. Ronkay, L. Ronkay & Witt, 2007
 Neotogaria flammifera (Houlbert, 1921)
 Neotogaria galema (Swinhoe, 1894)
 Neotogaria hoenei (Sick, 1941)
 Neotogaria saitonis Matsumura, 1931
 Neotogaria thomaswitti Laszlo, G. Ronkay & L. Ronkay, 2007

References

 , 1931, Insecta Matsumurana 7: 195.
 , 2007, Esperiana Buchreihe zur Entomologie Band 13: 1-683 

Thyatirinae
Drepanidae genera